Cougar Canyon Wilderness is a  wilderness area in the US state of Utah.  It was designated March 30, 2009, as part of the Omnibus Public Land Management Act of 2009.  Located adjacent to Nevada in the northwestern corner of Washington County, it protects an area of hilly juniper-pinyon woodlands bordering the Dixie National Forest.

Cougar Canyon Wilderness is located near Doc's Pass Wilderness on the south, separated by a small road, and is bordered by Slaughter Creek Wilderness on the east.

See also
 Beaver Dam Wash
 List of U.S. Wilderness Areas
 Wilderness Act

References

External links
 Doc's Pass Wilderness - Wilderness.net
 Map of wilderness areas in northwestern Washington County, Utah

Wilderness areas of Utah
Protected areas of Washington County, Utah
Bureau of Land Management areas in Utah